Huping Ling (born 1956) is a professor of history and past department chair at Truman State University in Kirksville, Missouri, where she founded the Asian studies program.

Her research focuses on Asian American studies, including immigration and ethnicity, assimilation and adaptation, family and marriage, feminism, employment patterns, and community structures. A Ford Foundation Prize-winning author, she has published 11 books and more than 100 articles on Asian American studies, including immigration and ethnicity, assimilation and adaptation, transnationalism, family and marriage, employment patterns, and community structures.

Education and career

Ling began her career in teaching as a high school teacher in Taiyuan, Shanxi, China, from 1974 through 1978. In 1982, she graduated from Taiyuan's Shanxi University first in her class with a bachelor's degree in history. From 1982-85, she worked as an assistant professor of history at Shanxi University. In 1985, she was a visiting scholar at the history department at Georgetown University. She earned her master's in 1987 at the University of Oregon, and completed her Ph.D at Miami University (1991).
She began teaching as an assistant professor of history at Truman State University from 1991-1995.  In 1996, she became associate professor of history  and full professor in 2004.

She is a visiting professor with the Institute of Overseas Chinese Studies at Jinan University in Guangzhou, China. She is the Changjiang Scholar Chair Professor by the Chinese Ministry of Education at Wuhan Theoretical Research Center of Overseas Chinese Affairs Office of the State Council and China Central Normal University in Wuhan.

She also serves as:

 Consultant to the Overseas Chinese Affairs Office of Guangdong Provincial Government.
 Consultant for the Female Writers Association in Shanxi Province. 
 Member of the Board of Directors of Women Writers Association in Shanxi Province of the Chinese National Writers Association. 
 Executive editor of the Journal of Asian American Studies, the official journal of the Association for Asian American Studies.  For the same organization, she has served as the Board Director and Representative of the Midwest/Mountain/Canada Region" from 2001-2003.  Since 1999, she has been part of the "Steering Committee as a History Caucus."

She is the inaugural editor of the Rutgers University Press book series Asian American Studies Today. She has been a National Reviewer for The Choice, The Journal of Urban History, International Migration Review, The Journal of American Ethnic History, The Journal of American History for the Organization of American Historians, The Journal of the History of Sexuality for the University of Chicago Press, book manuscripts for the University of Hawaii Press, and textbooks by Prentice Hall. In 2004, she served on the Book Award Committee for the 46th Missouri Conference on History.

Courses
Among the courses she has taught at Truman:

Asian American History
Asian American Women
Seminar on Chinese American Women
East Asian Civilization 1 & 2
History of China 1 & 2
History of Japan 1 & 2
U.S. History

Books and articles
She has published 11 books and more than 100 articles on Asian American studies, including immigration and ethnicity, assimilation and adaptation, transnationalism, family and marriage, employment patterns, and community structures.

These works include:
Chinese Chicago: Race, Transnational Migration, and Community since 1870. Stanford University Press, 2012.
Asian American History and Cultures: An Encyclopedia.  Two volumes (with Allan W. Austin) M.E. Sharpe, 2010.
Asian America: Forming New Communities, Expanding Boundaries.  Rutgers University Press, 2009.
 Emerging Voices: Experiences of Underrepresented Asian Americans. Rutgers University Press, 2008.
Voices of the Heart: Asian American Women on Immigration, Work, and Family.  Truman State University Press, 2007.
Chinese in St. Louis: 1857-2007. Arcadia Publishing, 2007.
Chinese St. Louis: From Enclave to Cultural Community.  Philadelphia: Temple University Press, 2004.
Ping Piao Mei Guo: New Immigrants in America. Shanxi, China: Beiyue Literature and Art Publishing House, 2003.
Jinshan Yao: A History of Chinese American Women.  Beijing: Chinese Social Sciences Publishing House, 1999.
Surviving on the Gold Mountain: A History of Chinese American Women and Their Lives Albany: State University of New York Press, 1998.
"Chinese Chicago: Transnational Migration and Community, 1945-2010s." In Chinatown around the World, edited by Chee-Beng Tan and Bernard Wong, 2012.
"Negotiating Migration: Marriage and Changing Gender Roles among the Chinese Diaspora," In Handbook of the Chinese Diaspora, edited by Chee-Beng Tan, Routledge, 2012.
"Asian Americans in Missouri." In Asian America: A State by State Historical Encyclopedia, edited by Jun Xing, Greenwood Press, 2012.
"The Transnational World of Chinese Entrepreneurs in Chicago, 1870s to 1940s: New Sources and Perspectives on Southern Chinese Emigration." In Frontier History in China, Vol.6, No.3 (2011): 370-406.
"The Changing Public Image of Chinese Americans and the Rise of China." In 21st Century International Review, (March 2011): 10-15.
"Chinese-American women," In Women in American History: An Encyclopedia, edited by Hasia R. Diner, Facts on File, 2011.
"Chinese Immigrants," In Encyclopedia of the American Immigration, edited by R. Kent Rasmussen, Salem Press, 2010.
"Chinese Chicago: Transnational Migration and Businesses, 1890s-1930s." In Journal of Chinese Overseas Vol. 6 (2010): 250-285.

She has also edited anthologies and was co-editor of Asian American History and Culture: An Encyclopedia.

Honors

 Ford Foundation Book Award. 
 2006: Walker and Doris Allen Fellowship award for faculty excellence, with a prize of $10,000.  She was also a finalist for the same award for the previous year.
 2006 Best Article Award at Missouri Conference on History  
 2004: Golden Apple Award from the Order of Omega and Truman State University's Greek Community. 
 2010: Booklist/Reference Books Bulletin Editors' Choice Award.

She has also been a semi-finalist several times for Truman's Educator of the Year award

Public appearances

Ling has made many public appearances. She has been featured in Top China, The World Journal (Feb. 2, 2012, Jan. 15, 2006), Chicago Daily Herald, Dallas Morning News, West End Word (Feb. 4, 2005), St. Louis Post-Dispatch (Feb. 2, 2005), St. Louis Chinese American News, St. Louis Chinese Journal, the Overseas Chinese World, River Front Times, among others. She has appeared on radio talk programs including  "Charles Brennan Show" KMOX 1120, "Voice of St. Louis", and KWMU 90.7 (NPR in St. Louis) "St. Louis on the Air". She has also been included in many books/encyclopedias on famous Chinese Americans and authors . She is frequently invited to lecture on Asian cultures and Asian American experiences at conferences, universities, schools, libraries, government and private agencies, and community organizations, nationally and internationally.

See also
 Chinese in St. Louis

Notes

References

External links
 Professor Huping Ling's webpage at Truman State University

Truman State University faculty
People's Republic of China emigrants to the United States
Miami University alumni
University of Oregon alumni
American writers of Chinese descent
Chinese-American history
Living people
1956 births
American academics of Chinese descent